This article contains a list of well-known Mexicans in science, publication, arts, politics and sports.

Arts 

 Manuel Álvarez Bravo, photographer; recipient, 1984 Hasselblad Award
 Pita Amor, poet
 Alberto Arai, architect, theorist and painter
 Luis Barragán, architect
 Federico Cantú, writer
 Leonora Carrington, painter
 Max Cetto, architect, educator and historian
 Joaquín Clausell, painter
 Miguel Covarrubias, painter
 José Luis Cuevas, painter, printmaker
 Gelsen Gas, theater director; film director and producer; actor; painter; poet; sculptor and inventor
 Mathias Goeritz, painter, sculptor and architect
 Jorge González Camarena, painter, muralist and sculptor
 Saturnino Herrán, painter
 Graciela Iturbide, photographer; recipient, 2008 Hasselblad Award
 María Izquierdo, painter
 Frida Kahlo, painter
 Arturo Moyers Villena, painter
 Gerardo Murillo, painter
 Amado Nervo, poet
 Juan O'Gorman, painter and architect
 José Clemente Orozco, muralist, printmaker
 Eugenio Peschard, architect
 Beatriz Peschard, architect
 Guillermo Ríos Alcalá restoration expert and educator
 Antonio Rivas Mercado, architect and engineer
 Arturo Rivera, painter
 Diego Rivera, muralist, painter, printmaker
 Jesusa Rodríguez, director and performer
 Michel Rojkind, architect
 Verónica Ruiz de Velasco, figurative artist
 José Francisco Xavier de Salazar y Mendoza, painter
 Sebastián, sculptor
 Javier Sicilia, poet, activist
 David Alfaro Siqueiros, muralist, painter, printmaker
 Rufino Tamayo, painter, printmaker
 Mauricio Toussaint, painter
 Remedios Varo, painter
 José María Velasco, painter
 Abraham Zabludovsky, architect
 Alejandro Zohn, architect

Authors 

 Ignacio Manuel Altamirano
 Pita Amor
 Juan José Arreola
 Guillermo Arriaga
 Mariano Azuela
 Caridad Bravo Adams
 Roberto Bravo
 Ignacio Burgoa Orihuela
 Emilio Carballido
 Rosario Castellanos
 Sor Juana Inés de la Cruz
 Yolanda Vargas Dulché
 Salvador Elizondo
 José Joaquín Fernández de Lizardi
 Carlos Fuentes
 Martín Luis Guzmán
 Guadalupe Loaeza
 Gregorio López y Fuentes
 Ángeles Mastretta
 Carlos Monsiváis
 Nezahualcoyotl
 Salvador Novo
 Fernando del Paso
 José Emilio Pacheco
 Susana Palazuelos
 Alfredo Placencia
 Elena Poniatowska
 Alfonso Reyes
 José Revueltas
 Luis J. Rodriguez
 Juan Rulfo
 Juan Ruiz de Alarcón
 Jaime Sabines
 Paco Ignacio Taibo II
 Lourdes Urrea
 José Vasconcelos
 Agustín Yáñez

Businesspeople 

 María Asunción Aramburuzabala
 Jerónimo Arango
 Emilio Azcárraga Jean
 Emilio Azcárraga Milmo
 Emilio Azcárraga Vidaurreta
 Alberto Baillères
 Raúl Baillères
 Daniel Chavez Moran
 Andrés Conesa
 Juan Domingo Beckmann
 Arturo Elías Ayub
 Juan Enríquez
 Eugenio Garza Lagüera
 Eugenio Garza Sada, philanthropist
 Bernardo Gómez Martínez
 Roberto González Barrera
 Víctor González Torres
 Joaquín Guzmán
 Jorge Hank Rhon
 Alfredo Harp Helú
 Roberto Hernández Ramírez
 Fidel Kuri Grajales
 Germán Larrea Mota-Velasco
 Enrique Molina Sobrino
 Emilio Romano
 Pedro Romero de Terreros
 Alfonso Romo
 Hector Ruiz
 Isaac Saba Raffoul
 Ricardo Salinas Pliego
 Daniel Servitje Montull
 Carlos Slim
 Antonio Suárez
 Jorge Vergara
 Lorenzo Zambrano

Cartoonists 

 Lalo Alcaraz
 Paco Calderón
 José G. Cruz
 Eduardo del Río, Rius
 Bill Melendez
 José Guadalupe Posada

Musicians, conductors and composers of concert music 

 Rubén Albarrán
 Alfonso Mejia-Arias, musician, writer, social activist, politician
 Antonio Aguilar, singer, composer
 Juan Arvizu, lyric tenor
 Alejandra Ávalos, singer-songwriter, actress, composer
 Ariel Camacho
 Natanael Cano
 Felix Carrasco, conductor
 Nestor Mesta Chayres, lyric tenor
 Rey Alejandro Conde, conductor 
 Manuel Esperón, composer, musician, conductor
 Pedro Fernández, singer-songwriter, actor, composer
 Vicente Fernández, singer, composer
 Horacio Franco, recorder player
 Mike Fuentes, drummer
 Juan Gabriel, singer 
 Irma González, operatic soprano
 Saúl Hernández
 Pedro Infante singer, composer
 Agustin Lara, singer, composer
 Armando Manzanero, singer, composer
 Manuel M. Ponce, musician, composer
 Jaime Preciado, bassist
 Carlos Miguel Prieto
 Silvestre Revueltas, composer, conductor
 Elvira Ríos, singer-songwriter, actress, composer
 Jesús Adrián Romero, Christian singer-songwriter
 Cesar Rosas, singer, vocalist
 Juventino Rosas
 Paulina Rubio, singer 
 Chalino Sánchez
 Joan Sebastian, singer, composer
 Marco Antonio Solís, singer, composer
 Thalía, singer

Entertainers

A–C 

 Amalia Aguilar, actress
 Mauricio Aspe, actor
 Alejandro Felipe, actor
 Antonio Aguilar, singer
 Luis Aguilar, singer
 Pepe Aguilar, singer
 Elsa Aguirre, actress
 Rubén Aguirre, comedian, actor
 Damián Alcázar, actor
 Julio Alemán, actor
 Fernando Allende, actor, film director
 Ana Alicia, actress
 Mario Almada, actor
 Ilean Almaguer, actress
 Rafael Amaya, actor
 César Amigó, film director
 Adolfo Angel, singer
 Angélica María, singer
 Alfonso Aráu, actor and director
 Guillermo Arriaga,  screenwriter, director and producer
 Ramón Ayala, singer
 Anahí, actress, singer
 Angélica Aragón, actress
 Abraham Ramos, actor
 Aracely Arámbula, actress
 Esteban Arce, show host
 Pedro Armendáriz, actor
 Pedro Armendáriz Jr., actor
 Adriana Barraza, actress
 Meche Barba, actress
 Ana Bárbara, singer
 Katie Barberi, actress
 Alejandra Barros, actress
 Renato Bartilotti, actor
 Sergio Basañez, actor
 Kuno Becker, actor
 Lola Beltrán, singer
 Belinda, actress, singer
 Elsa Benítez, model
 Agustín Bernal, actor
 Demián Bichir, actor
 Jorge Blanco, actor, singer
 Marcela Bovio, singer
 Angelique Boyer, actress
 Jacqueline Bracamontes, actress, model
 Olga Breeskin, vedette
 Claudio Brook, actor
 Andrés Bustamante, comedian
 Alejandro Camacho, actor and producer
 Jaime Camil, singer, actor
 Marco Antonio Campos Viruta, comedian, actor
 Carmen Campuzano, actress, fashion model
 Itatí Cantoral, actress
 Paty Cantú, singer
 Eduardo Capetillo, actor
 Elpidia Carrillo, actress
 Yadhira Carrillo, actress
 Irán Castillo, actress
 Cristian Castro, singer
 Verónica Castro, actress, singer
 David Cavazos, singer
 Lumi Cavazos, actress
 Christian Chávez, actor, singer
 Sharis Cid, actress
 Fernando Colunga, actor
 Ninel Conde, actress, model, singer
 Karla Cossío, actress
 Alfonso Cuarón, film director
 Luis de Alba, actor, comedian
 Rebecca de Alba, show host
 Alfonso de Anda, show host
 José María de Tavira, actor
 Ana de la Reguera, actress
 Arath de la Torre, actor
 María Antonieta de las Nieves, actress
 Kate del Castillo, actress

D–G 

 Ana Díaz, singer
 Dolores del Río, actress
 Yolanda del Río, singer
 Guillermo del Toro, film director
 Gonzalo de la Torre, singer, producer
 Eugenio Derbez, actor, comedian, producer
 Aarón Díaz, actor
 Columba Domínguez, actress
 Susana Dosamantes, actress
 Lila Downs, singer
 Dulce María, actress, singer, composer
 Jean Duverger, actor, show host
 Elán, singer-songwriter
 Fernando Eimbcke, film director, screenwriter
 Emilio Echevarría, actor
 Liza Echeverría, model, show host
 Alfredo Gatica, actor
 Luis Gatica, actor
 Erika Buenfil, actress
 Erick Elías, actor, model
 Evangelina Elizondo, actress
 Emmanuel, singer
 Luis Ernesto Franco, actor
 Lorena Enríquez, actress
 José Guadalupe Esparza, singer
 María Félix, actress
 Alejandro Fernández, singer
 Pedro Fernández, singer-songwriter, actor, composer, producer
 Vicente Fernández, singer
 Juan Ferrara, actor
 Laura Flores, actress
 Adriana Fonseca, actress
 Rubén Fuentes, actor
 Juan Gabriel, singer, composer
 Francisco Gabilondo Soler, "Cri-Cri", songwriter
 Gael García Bernal, actor
 Sara García, actress
 Eduardo Garza, voice actor
 Bibi Gaytán, actress
 Alfredo Gil, singer, guitarist, founding member of Trio los Panchos
 Filippa Giordano, crossover singer
 Ernesto Gómez Cruz, actor
 Roberto Gómez Bolaños Chespirito, actor, director, songwriter and screenwriter
 Alejandro González Iñárritu, film director
 Edith González, actress
 Sherlyn González, actress
 Susana González, actress
 Ely Guerra, singer-songwriter, musician, composer
 Denisse Guerrero, singer
 Emilia Guiú, actress
 Elizabeth Gutiérrez, actress
 Alejandra Guzmán, singer
 Enrique Guzmán, singer
 Vanessa Guzmán, actress, model

H–M 

 Laura Harring, actress
 Hector Soberon, actor
 Salma Hayek, actress
 Plutarco Haza, actor
 Gaspar Henaine Capulina, actor and comedian
 Saul Hernández, singer
 Carlos Hernández Vázquez, film director
 Alfonso Herrera, actor, singer
 Lorena Herrera, actress
 Pedro Infante, singer, actor
 Mauricio Islas, actor
 Frankie J, singer
 Altair Jarabo, actress
 Rodolfo Jiménez, actor
 José Alfredo Jiménez, singer-songwriter, musician, composer
 José José, singer
 Lupita Jones, Miss Universe 1991
 Judith Grace, show host
 Katy Jurado, actress
 Ines Gomez Mont, television host
 Kalimba, singer
 Natalia Lafourcade, singer
 Imanol Landeta, actor, singer
 Valentino Lanús, actor
 Norma Lazareno, actress
 Ana Layevska, actress
 Mariana Levy, actress 
 Iyari Limon, actress
 Issa Lish, model
 Claudia Lizaldi, model
 Patricia Llaca, actress
 Xavier López, Chabelo, actor
 Renato López, musician, show host
 Seidy López, actress
 Alex Lora, musician, singer-songwriter
 Ana Lorena Sánchez, actress
 Adriana Louvier, actress
 Karyme Lozano, actress
 Lucero, actress, singer
 Luis Miguel, singer
 Daniela Luján, actress, singer
 Ernesto Laguardia, actor
 Fernando Luján, actor
 Diego Luna, actor, director
 Tony MacFarland, actor
 Sara Maldonado, actress, comedian
 Julio Mannino, actor
 Patricia Manterola, singer
 Erik Mariñelarena, film director
 María Elena Marqués, actress
 Adalberto Martínez Resortes, comedian and actor
 Karla Martínez, show host
 Ingrid Martz, actress
 Ofelia Medina, actress
 Tenoch Huerta Mejia, actor
 Bill Melendez, animator
 Lucía Méndez, actress, singer
 Florinda Meza, actress
 Jaydy Michel, fashion model
 Miroslava, actress
 Maya Mishalska, actress
 Nicky Mondellini, actress
 Ricardo Montalbán, actor
 Pilar Montenegro, actress, singer
 Pablo Montero, singer, actor
 Ivonne Montero, actress
 Andrés Montiel, actor
 Galilea Montijo, actress
 Mario Moreno Cantinflas, actor and comedian
 Bárbara Mori, actress, model
 Sabine Moussier, actress
 Marco Antonio Muñiz, singer
 Evita Muñoz, actress, comedian, singer
 Eduardo Manzano, actor
 René Muñoz, actor
 Úrsula Murayama, actress

N–R 

 Ximena Navarrete, model, Miss Universe 2010
 Chucho Navarro, singer, guitarist, founding member of Trio Los Panchos
 Guillermo Navarro, cinematographer
 Sylvia Navarro, actress
 Patricia Navidad, actress
 Jorge Negrete, singer, actor
 Mónica Noguera, television host, model
 Adela Noriega, actress
 Manuel "Manolo" Noriega, stage and film actor
 Nailea Norvind, actress
 Ramón Novarro, actor
 Lupita Nyong'o, actress
 Ona Grauer, actress
 Manuel Ojeda, actor
 Fher Olvera, singer
 Mauricio Ochmann, actor
 Yahir Othon, actor, singer
 Dominika Paleta, actress
 Ludwika Paleta, actress
 Andrea Palma, actress
 Joaquín Pardavé, actor, director, songwriter and screenwriter
 Plankton Man, musician
 Sylvia Pasquel, actress
 Arturo Peniche, actor
 Maite Perroni, actress, singer
 Silvia Pinal, actress, show host
 Salvador Pineda, actor
 Polo Polo, comedian
 María Antonieta Pons, actress
 Enrique Rambal, actor
 Adal Ramones, comedian
 Marco Antonio Regil, television host
 Miguel Alejandro Reina, film director
 Diana Reyes, singer
 Carlos Reygadas, film director, winner of the Best Director Award in Cannes
 Cornelio Reyna, singer
 Lalo Ríos, Mexican-born American actor
 Angélica Rivera, actress
 Jorge Rivero, actor
 Aurora Robles, supermodel
 Enrique Rocha, actor
 Paul Rodriguez, comedian, actor
 Helena Rojo, actress
 María Rojo, actress
 Gilbert Roland, actor
 Daniela Romo, actress, singer
 Rosa Carmina. actress
 Alessandra Rosaldo, actress, singer
 Paulina Rubio, singer
 Ximena Rubio, actress
 Victoria Ruffo, actress

S–Z 

 Jorge Salinas, actor
 Nora Salinas, actress

 Carlos Santana, musician
 Pablo Santos, actor
 Eugenio Siller, actor
 Joan Sebastian, singer
 Mariana Seoane, singer
 Ana Serradilla, actress
 Antonio Serrano, director
 Karol Sevilla, actress, singer
 Camila Sodi, actress
 Sasha Sokol, singer
 Fernando Soler, actor
 Juan Soler, actor
 Javier Solís, singer
 Marco Antonio Solís, singer
 Blanca Soto, fashion model
 Gabriel Soto, actor, model
 Karla Souza, actress
 Hugo Stiglitz, actor
 Devin Tailes, singer
 Mark Tacher, actor
 Ana Claudia Talancón, actress
 Mario Talavera, songwriter
 Amado Tame Shear, Mexican politician
 Tatiana, singer
 Ari Telch, actor
 Arleth Terán, actress
 Thalía, actress, singer
 Lynda Thomas, musician, singer-songwriter
 Thelma Tixou, vedette
 José Antonio Torres, film director
 Lupita Tovar, actress
 Rigo Tovar, singer-songwriter, composer, actor
 Gloria Trevi, singer
 Víctor Trujillo / Brozo, actor, comedian
 Emilio Tuero, actor, singer
 Elyfer Torres, actress
 Christopher Uckermann, actor, singer
 Polo Urías, singer
 Germán Valdés, Tin Tán, actor
 Ramón Valdés, don Ramón, actor
 Victor Noriega, actor, singer,  model
 Angélica Vale, actress, singer, comedian
 Verónica Valerio, singer, harpist and composer
 Sergio Vallín, guitarist
 Pedro Vargas, singer
 María Elena Velasco La India María, actress, comedian
 Lorena Velázquez, actress
 Raúl Velasco, entertainer and television producer
 Lupe Vélez, actress
 Julieta Venegas, singer-songwriter, composer, musician
 Eduardo Verástegui, actor, model
 Carlos Villagrán, actor
 David Villalpando, actor
 Mayrín Villanueva, actress
 Alicia Villarreal, singer
 Edgar Vivar, actor
 Kat Von D, model, musician, tattoo artist 
 Eduardo Victoria, actor
 Gonzalo Garcia Vivanco, actor
 Nena von Schlebrügge, fashion model 
 Laisha Wilkins, actress
 Laura Zapata, actress
 Jesús Zavala, actor, singer
 Humberto Zurita, actor

Historians, economists and social scientists 

 Lucas Alamán
 Ramón Alcaraz
 Francisco Javier Clavijero
 Francisco del Paso y Troncoso
 Everardo Elizondo
 Clara Jusidman
 Ricardo Lancaster-Jones y Verea
 Miguel León-Portilla
 Eduardo Matos Moctezuma, archaeologist
 Jean Meyer
 Edmundo O'Gorman
 Alejandro Peschard Fernández
 Armand Peschard-Sverdrup
 Jacqueline Peschard
 Pedro Thomas Ruiz de Velasco
 Fernando Escalante Gonzalbo, sociologist

Intellectuals and writers 

 Héctor Aguilar Camín
 Gabriel Careaga Medina
 Mariano Azuela
 Edmundo Cetina Velázquez, philosopher
 Daniel Cosío Villegas
 Fernando del Paso, Cervantes Prize winner
 Germán Dehesa
 Alberto Espinosa Desigaud
 Salvador Elizondo
 Juan Escoto
 Carlos Fuentes, Cervantes Prize winner
 Jorge Ibargüengoitia
 Alfonso García Robles, winner of the Nobel Peace Prize in 1982
 Enrique Krauze
 Mario Ojeda Gómez
 Octavio Paz, winner of the 1990 Nobel Prize for Literature
 Alfonso Reyes
 Juan Rulfo
 Moises Saenz
 Juan Manuel Silva Camarena, philosopher, professor and academic
 José Vasconcelos
 Gabriel Zaid

Journalists 

 Carmen Aristegui
 Jesús Blancornelas
 Manuel Buendía
 Lydia Cacho
 María Antonieta Collins
 Denise Dresser
 Isidro Fabela
 Giselle Fernández
 Pedro Ferriz de Con
 Pedro Ferriz Santacruz
 Ricardo Flores Magón
 Joaquín López-Dóriga
 Carlos Loret de Mola
 Adela Micha
 Margarita Michelena
 Jorge Ramos
 Paola Rojas
 Javier Solórzano
 Lilly Téllez
 Jacobo Zabludovsky

Sports journalists 
 José Roberto Pepe Espinosa
 David Faitelson
 Inés Sainz
 Pedro El Mago Septién
 José Ramón Fernández (journalist)

Military, revolutionaries and guerrilla (fighters) 

 Juan Aldama
 Ignacio Allende
 Felipe Ángeles
 José Azueta
 Lucio Cabañas
 Porfirio Díaz
 Mariano Escobedo
 Enrique Gorostieta
 Vicente Guerrero
 Rafael Sebastián Guillén, Subcomandante Marcos
 Miguel Hidalgo y Costilla
 Victoriano Huerta
 José Mariano Jiménez
 Emilio Kosterlitzky
 Antonio López de Santa Anna
 Ignacio López Rayón
 Mariano Matamoros
 José María Morelos y Pavón
 Victoriano "El Catorce" Ramírez
 Leona Vicario
 Pancho Villa
 Emiliano Zapata

Monarchs 

Emperor Agustin I
Emperor Maximiliano I

Politicians 

 Ignacio Gregorio Comonfort de los Ríos
 Miguel Alemán Valdés
 Miguel Alemán Velasco
 Gilberto Bosques Saldívar
 Luis H. Álvarez
 Eduardo Bours
 Felipe Calderón
 Heberto Castillo
 Manuel J. Clouthier
 Cuauhtémoc
 Cuauhtémoc Cárdenas
 Lázaro Cárdenas Batel
 Lázaro Cárdenas del Río
 Venustiano Carranza
 Luis Donaldo Colosio
 Porfirio Díaz
 Marcelo Ebrard
 Diego Fernández de Cevallos
 Marti Batres
 Vicente Fox
 Rosa Albina Garavito
 José Eleuterio González, Gonzalitos
 Manuel Gómez Morín
 Plutarco Elías Calles
 Elba Esther Gordillo
 Carlos Hank González
 Jorge Hank Rhon
 Enrique Jackson
 Benito Juárez
 Vicente Lombardo Toledano
 Andrés Manuel López Obrador
 José López Portillo
 Francisco I. Madero
 Carlos A. Madrazo
 Roberto Madrazo
 Arnoldo Martínez Verdugo
 Moctezuma Ilhuicamina
 Moctezuma Xocoyotzin
 Antonio Ortiz Mena
 Enrique Peña Nieto
 Armando Ríos Piter
 Rosario Robles
 Carlos Salinas de Gortari
Claudia Sheinbaum 
 Jesús Silva-Herzog
 Fidel Velázquez
 Ernesto Zedillo
 Demetrio Sodi

Religious people 
 Ernesto Corripio y Ahumada, Cardinal
 Felipe de Jesús, Saint (Martyr)
 Juan Diego Cuauhtlatoatzin, Saint
 Anacleto González Flores, Beato, (Martyr)
 Rafael Guízar Valencia, Bishop, Saint
 Miguel Hidalgo y Costilla
 Javier Lozano Barragán, Cardinal
 Cristóbal Magallanes Jara, Saint
 Miguel Agustín Pro, Beato, (Martyr)
 Norberto Rivera, Cardinal
 José Sánchez del Río, Beato (Martyr)
Margarito Bautista, theologian and religious founder

Science and technology

A–L 
 José Adem, mathematician
 Miguel Alcubierre, theoretical and computational physicist; see Alcubierre drive
 Celia Mercedes Alpuche Aranda, infectious diseases researcher
 Fernando Altamirano, physician, botanist and naturalist
 Miguel Alvarez del Toro, biologist
 Carlos Arias Ortiz, biochemist
 León Ávalos y Vez, mechanical engineer
 Juan Francisco Azcárate, military, aircraft designer and engineer
 Albert Baez, physicist
 Isidro Baldenegro López, awarded the 2005 Goldman Environmental Prize
 Alicia Bárcena Ibarra, biologist
 Francisco Barnés de Castro, engineer
 Marcos E. Becerra, anthropologist and botanist
 Jacob Bekenstein, physicist; contributed to the foundation of black hole thermodynamics; see the Bekenstein bound
 Francisco Bolívar Zapata, biochemist and professor
 Alberto Bustani Adem, engineer
 Edwin Bustillos, awarded the Goldman Environmental Prize in 1996
 Juan Ismael Calzada, botanist; credited with the discovery of the elm Ulmus ismaelis
 Carlos Canseco, physician and philanthropist
 Nabor Carrillo Flores, nuclear physicist, scientific advisor and former president of UNAM
 Heberto Castillo, civil engineer and political activist
 Ana María Cetto, physicist
 Ignacio Chapela, microbial ecologist and mycologist; notable for his work with natural resources and indigenous right|uprights
 Ignacio Chávez Sánchez, physician and cardiologist
 Alejandro Corichi, theoretical physics; contributed to the understanding of classical aspects of black holes
 Jorge Cuesta, chemist
 José Antonio de Alzate y Ramírez, scientist
 Miguel de Icaza, free software programmer; started GNOME
 Pablo de la Llave, biologist
 Antonio de León y Gama, astronomer, anthropologist and writer
 Andrés Manuel del Río, chemist; discovered vanadium
 Alfredo Dugès, biologist
 Luis Enrique Erro, astronomer
 Henry Eyring, chemist
 Jefa Fabiana, head of nursing
Carlos Frenk, astronomer; pioneer in simulations of large-scale structure
 Héctor García-Molina, database researcher
 Ángel María Garibay K, linguist
 Francisco Javier González-Acuña, mathematician
 Guillermo González Camarena, inventor of the first color television system
 Rosario María Gutiérrez Eskildsen, lexicographer, linguist, educator, and poet
 Julio César Gutiérrez Vega, physicist
 Gastón Guzmán, mycologist and anthropologist
 Guadalupe Hayes-Mota, biotechnologist and business director
 Guillermo Haro, astrophysicist and astronomer; co-discoverer of Herbig-Haro objects
 Alfonso L. Herrera, biologist
 José María Lanz, mathematician and engineer
 Yolanda Lastra, linguist
 Antonio Lazcano, biologist
 Jesús León Santos, awarded the 2008 Goldman Environmental Prize
 José Luis Lezama, scientist
 Susana López Charreton, biochemist
 Ana María López Colomé, biochemist

M–Z 
 Miguel Ángel J. Márquez Ruiz, veterinarian
 German Martinez Hidalgo, physicist, mathematician, chemist and astronomer
 Daniel Mastretta, engineer and car designer
 Héctor Mayagoitia Domínguez, chemist
 Federico Mena, computer programmer
 Luis E. Miramontes, co-inventor of the contraceptive pill
 Ricardo Miledi, neuroscientist who won the Royal Medal in 1998
 Cristina Mittermeier, photographer and biochemical engineer
 José Mariano Mociño, botanist
 Mario J. Molina, Nobel Prize winner in 1995
 Carmen Mondragón Nahui Olin, model, painter and poet
 General Manuel Mondragón, firearm designer
 Rodolfo Montiel Flores, awarded the Goldman Environmental Prize in 2000
 Rodolfo Neri Vela, astronaut and scientist
 Víctor Neumann-Lara, mathematician
 Melchor Ocampo, biologist, politician
 Esther Orozco, biologist
 Federico Ortiz Quezada, urologist
 Antonio Peña Díaz, biochemist
 Arcadio Poveda, astronomer; developed a method to calculate the mass of elliptical galaxies
 Marco Rito-Palomares, biologist
 Diego Rodríguez, mathematician, astronomer, educator and technological innovator
 Raúl Rojas, computer scientist and mathematician
 Arturo Rosenblueth, physician and physiologist
 Reyes Tamez Guerra, immunochemist
 Ted Taylor, physicist, nuclear-weapons designer
 Fernando Vallejo, biologist, filmmaker and writer
 Evangelina Villegas, biochemist
Hilda Villegas Castrejón, surgeon and a pioneer in electron microscopy
 Nora Volkow, physician
 Rossana Reguillo, social scientist

Sports

American football 
 Isaac Alarcón, NFL, offensive tackle
 Raúl Allegre, NFL, placekicker
 Rolando Cantu, NFL, offensive guard
 Frank Corral, NFL, placekicker
 Tom Fears, NFL, wide receiver
 Efrén Herrera, NFL, placekicker
 Victor Leyva, NFL, offensive guard
 Marco Martos, NFL Europe, wide receiver, head coach
 Jose Portilla, NFL, offensive tackle
 Ramiro Pruneda, NFL, offensive tackle
 Aldo Richins, NFL, wingback
 Rafael Septién, NFL, placekicker
 Joaquin Zendejas, NFL, placekicker
 Luis Zendejas, NFL, placekicker
 Marty Zendejas, NFL, placekicker
 Max Zendejas, NFL, placekicker
 Tony Zendejas, NFL, placekicker

Baseball 
 Juan Acevedo, MLB, pitcher
 Alfredo Aceves, MLB, pitcher
 Tavo Álvarez, MLB, pitcher
 Alfredo Amézaga, MLB
 Bobby Ávila, MLB, second baseman
 Luis Ayala, MLB, pitcher
 Manny Bañuelos, MLB, pitcher
 Nelson Barrera, LMB, infielder / designated hitter
 Rigo Beltrán, MLB, pitcher
 Vinny Castilla, MLB, third baseman, manager
 Humberto Cota, MLB, catcher
 Jorge Cantú, MLB, third baseman / first baseman
 Luis Cruz, MLB, shortstop
 Jorge de la Rosa, MLB, pitcher
 Elmer Dessens, MLB, pitcher
 Erubiel Durazo, MLB, first baseman
 Narciso Elvira, MLB, pitcher
 Héctor Espino, LMB & MPL, first baseman, manager
 Francisco Paquín Estrada, LMB, catcher, manager
 Marco Estrada, MLB, pitcher
 Yovani Gallardo, MLB, pitcher
 Jaime García, MLB, pitcher
 Benji Gil, MLB, infielder
 Miguel Gonzalez, MLB, pitcher
 Victor González, MLB, pitcher
 Teddy Higuera, MLB, pitcher
 Arnold León, MLB, pitcher
 Esteban Loaiza, MLB, pitcher
 Aurelio López, MLB, relief pitcher
 Jorge Orta, MLB, second baseman / designated hitter / outfielder
 Roberto Osuna, MLB, pitcher
 Ramiro Peña, MLB, infielder
 Óliver Pérez, MLB, pitcher
 Dennys Reyes, MLB, pitcher
 Oscar Robles, MLB, infielder
 Aurelio Rodríguez, MLB, third baseman
 Fernando Salas, MLB, pitcher
 Ali Solis, MLB, catcher
 Joakim Soria, MLB, relief pitcher
 Julio Urías, MLB, pitcher
 José Urquidy, MLB, pitcher
 Fernando Valenzuela, MLB, pitcher
 Christian Villanueva, MLB, third baseman

Basketball 
 Gustavo Ayón, NBA, center
 Romel Beck, NBA Development League, point guard
 Jorge Gutiérrez, NBA, point guard
 Horacio Llamas, NBA, center
 Eduardo Nájera, NBA, forward

Martial arts 
 Jessica Aguilar, UFC, mixed martial artist 
 Brandon Moreno, UFC, mixed martial artist
 Yair Rodríguez, UFC, mixed martial arts
 Irene Aldana, UFC, mixed martial arts
 Alexa Grasso, UFC, mixed martial arts

Tennis 
 Enrique Abaroa
 Bruno Echagaray
 Daniel Garza
 Lucas Gómez
 Santiago González
 Hans Hach Verdugo
 Tigre Hank
 Luis Herrera
 Leonardo Lavalle
 Mario Llamas
 Jorge Lozano
 Francisco Maciel
 Juan Manuel Elizondo
 Agustín Moreno
 Óscar Ortiz
 Rafael Osuna
 Antonio Palafox
 Luis Patiño
 Raúl Ramírez
 Yola Ramírez
 Miguel Ángel Reyes-Varela
 Manuel Sánchez
 Renata Zarazúa

Boxing 

 Saúl Canelo Álvarez
 Romeo Anaya
 Alfredo El Perro Angulo
 Jorge Travieso Arce
 Jose Tecuala Argumedo
 Ricardo Arredondo
 Antonio Avelar
 Gilberto Keb Baby Luis V Baas
 Marco Antonio Baby-Faced Assassin Barrera
 César El Paso Bazán
 José Becerra
 Ray Sugar Beltrán
 Miguel El Alacrán Berchelt
 Víctor El Acorazado Burgos
 Luis Ramón Yori Boy Campas
 Miguel Canto
 Cruz Chucho Carbajal
 Chango Carmona
 Jesús ''Chucho Castillo
 Freddy Castillo
 José Luis Castillo
 Martín El Gallo Castillo
 Hugo El Increíble Cázares
 Julio Pollito Ceja
 Julio César El Gran Campeón Mexicano Chávez
 Julio César El hijo de la leyenda Chávez Jr
 Jesús El Tigre Chong
 Julio Cesar El Rey Martinez
 Julio César Pingo Miranda
 Cristóbal Lacandón Cruz
 Carlos Cuadras
 Pipino Cuevas
 Ricardo Delgado, Olympic boxing
 Juan de la Rosa
 Antonio DeMarco
 Gamaliel El Plátano Díaz
 Julio The Kidd Díaz
 Guty Puro Yucatán Espadas
 Juan José Dinamita Estrada
 Juan Francisco El Gallo Estrada
 Moisés Moy Fuentes
 Alejandro Terra Garcia
 Isidro El Chino Garcia
 Raúl Rayito Garcia
 Néstor El Tigre Garza
 Alfonso Gómez
 Miguel Ángel González
 Jhonny González
 Humberto González
 Rodolfo González
 Rodrigo Gatito Guerrero
 Pedro Guevara
 Adrián El Confesor Hernández
 Juan Churritos Hernández
 Rafael Herrera
 Ramón García Hirales
 Oscar "El Chololo" Larios
 Carlos Mexicanito Licona
 Rafael Bazooka Limón
 Ganigan El Maravilla Lopez
 Ricardo Finito López
 Rodolfo Rudy López
 Raúl Macías
 Lupe Madera
 Hernán Márquez
 Juan Manuel Dinamita Márquez
 Rafael Márquez
 Abner Mares
 Rodolfo Martínez
 Manuel "Mantecas" Medina
 Javier Cobra Mendoza
 Juan Meza
 Cristian El Diamante Mijares
 Carlos King Molina
 Fernando Cochulito Montiel
 Diego Pelucho Morales
 Erik Terrible Morales
 Jaime Munguía
 Rubén Púas Olivares
 Jorge Maromero Páez
 Jackie Princesa Azteca Nava
 Emanuel El Vaquero Navarrete
 Luis Pantera Nery
 Oswaldo El Gallito Novoa
 Carlos Palomino
 Raúl Pérez
 Lupe Pintor
 Daniel Ponce de León
 José El Gallito Quirino
 Gilberto Zurdo de Oro Ramírez
 José Luis Ramírez
 Luis Ramón "Yori Boy" Campas Medina
 Joaquín Rocha
 Francisco Rodríguez Jr.
 Mario Dragoncito Rodriguez
 Tomás Gusano Rojas
 Antonio Roldán
 Gilberto Román
 Omar Giant Killer Romero
 Hugo Cuatito Ruiz
 Lauro Salas
 Vicente Saldivar
 Juan Matador Salgado
 Orlando ''Siri Salido
 Clemente ''Xicotencatl Sanchez
 Rubén Yiyo Sánchez
 Salvador Sal Sánchez
 Léo El Terremoto Santa Cruz
 Giovani El Guerrero Azteca Segura
 Laura Serrano
 Ulises Solís
 Édgar Sosa
 Elwin La Pulga Soto
 Humberto La Zorrita Soto
 Victor Vikingo Terrazas
 Efren Torres
 Ana María Torres
 Óscar Valdez
 Francisco El Bandido Vargas
 Rey Vargas
 Israel Magnifico Vázquez
 Miguel El Títere Vázquez
 Luis Kid Azteca Villanueva
 Alfredo Xeque
 Alfonso Zamora
 Daniel Zaragoza
 Carlos Zárate Serna
 Juan Zurita

Bullfighters 
 Alejandro Amaya
 Carlos Arruza
 Jaime Bravo
 Guillermo Capetillo
 Eloy Cavazos
 Michelito Lagravere
 Rafita Mirabal
 Silverio Pérez
 Carmelo Torres

Football

A–M

N–Z

Motorsports 
 Carlos Contreras, NASCAR
 Luis Díaz, CART, American Le Mans Series
 Mario Domínguez, CART
 Adrián Fernández, CART, American Le Mans Series
 Josele Garza, CART
 Jorge Goeters, NASCAR
 Ricardo González, CART, FIA WEC
 Benito Guerra, rallying
 Carlos Guerrero, CART
 Esteban Gutiérrez, Formula One
 Israel Jaitovich, NASCAR, road racer
 Michel Jourdain Jr., CART, NASCAR and rallying
 Sergio Checo Pérez, Formula One
 Jo Ramírez, team coordinator Formula One
 José Luis Ramírez, NASCAR
 Héctor Alonso Rebaque, Formula One, CART
 Pedro Rodríguez, Formula One
 Ricardo Rodríguez, Formula One
 Memo Rojas, Rolex Sports Car Series
 Moisés Solana, Formula One
 Daniel Suárez, NASCAR
 Ricardo Triviño, rallying

Olympic and Paralympian athletes 
 Raúl Alcalá, bicycle road racing
 Daniel Bautista, racewalking
 Perla Bustamante, Paralympian, track and field
 Ernesto Canto, racewalking
 Joaquín Capilla, diving
 Alejandro Cárdenas, track and field
 Everardo Cristóbal Quirino, canoe racing
 Nancy Contreras, track cycling
 Paola Espinosa, diving
 María del Rosario Espinoza, taekwondo
 Víctor Estrada, taekwondo
 Adriana Fernández, marathon runner
 Álvaro Gaxiola, diving
 Carlos Girón, diving
 Rodolfo Gómez, marathon runner
 Raúl González, racewalking
 Belem Guerrero, track cycling
 Ana Gabriela Guevara, track and field
 Salvador Hernandez, Paralympian, track and field
 Soraya Jiménez, weightlifter
 Brenda Magaña, gymnast
 Saúl Mendoza, Paralympian, wheelchair racer
 Humberto Mariles, equestrian
 Carlos Mercenario, racewalking
 Felipe Tibio Muñoz, swimming
 Rommel Pacheco, diving
 José Sargento Pedraza, racewalker
 Guillermo Pérez Sandoval, taekwondo
 Fernando Platas, diving
 Maria Teresa Ramírez, swimming
 Romary Rifka, high jump
 Pilar Roldán, fencing
 Iridia Salazar, taekwondo
 Oscar Salazar, taekwondo
 Mario Santillan, Paralympian, marathon
 Juan René Serrano, archery
Roberto Strauss, Olympic swimmer
 Rubén Uriza, equestrian
 Alberto Valdés, equestrian
 Jeny Velazco, Paralympian, track and field
 Hubertus von Hohenlohe, alpine skier
 José Manuel Youshimatz, track cycling
 Vanessa Zambotti, judo
 Luis Alberto Zepeda Félix, Paralympian, track and field

Wrestling 

 Alfonso Dantés, El Tanque
 Apolo Dantés
 Américo Rocca
 Atlantis
 Black Shadow
 Blue Demon
 Blue Panther
 Brazo de Plata / Super Porky
 Cavernario Galindo
 Cien Caras
 Charly Manson
 Alberto Del Rio / Dos Caras Jr.
 Dos Caras
 Dr. Wagner Jr.
 El Brazo
 El Canek
 El Dandy
 El Hijo del Santo
 El Santo
 Emilio Charles Jr.
 Enrique Llanes
 Faby Apache
 Heavy Metal
 Héctor Garza
 Ayako Hamada
 Jerry Estrada
 L. A. Park
 La Parka
 Lady Apache
 Latin Lover
 Lizmark
 Lizmark Jr.
 Mari Apache
 Máscara Año 2000
 Máscara Sagrada
 Mascarita Sagrada
 Mil Máscaras
 Miss Janeth
 Místico / Sin Cara
 Negro Casas
 Octagón
 Octagoncito
 Perro Aguayo
 Perro Aguayo Jr.
 Pierroth Jr.
 Pirata Morgan
 Rayo de Jalisco Jr.
 Rayo de Jalisco Sr.
 Ringo Mendoza
 Carmelo Reyes, Cien Caras
 Rito Romero
 Satánico
 Sexy Star
 Shocker
 Scorpio Jr.
 Tarzán López
 Villano III
 Volador Jr.
 Zuleyma

Golf 
 Ernesto Acosta
 Rafael Alarcón
 Rodolfo Cazaubón
 Roberto Díaz
 María Fassi
 Óscar Fraustro
 Alejandra Llaneza
 Gaby López
 Lorena Ochoa
 Carlos Ortiz
 Victor Regalado
 Violeta Retamoza
 José de Jesús Rodríguez
 Cesar Sanudo
 Esteban Toledo
 Sebastián Vázquez

Other sports 
 Álvaro Beltrán, racquetball
 Carlos Carsolio, mountaineering
 Jesús Castañón, horse racing
 Victor Espinoza, horse racing
 Jose L. Espinoza, horse racing
 David R. Flores, horse racing
 Martin García, horse racing
 Carlos Gracida, polo
 Memo Gracida, polo
 Mario Gutierrez, horse racing
 Alberto Harari, horse racing
 Paola Longoria, racquetball
 Paco Lopez, horse racing
 Roberto Mangas, mountaineering
 Sergio Perez, Formula 1
 Álvaro Pineda, horse racing
 Roberto Pineda, horse racing
 Eusebio Razo Jr., horse racing
 Carlos Torre Repetto, chess
 Samantha Salas, racquetball
 Marcel Sisniega Campbell, chess

See also 

List of Mexican Americans
List of Mexican British people

References